Olga Cavalli is an internet leader known for enhancing Internet governance participation in Latin and Central America. She is an active member in ICANN, and is currently a GNSO Council Member appointed by ICANN's Nomcom. Previously she was vicechair of the GAC, and a former MAG member at the United Nations. In 2007, she co-founded the South School on Internet Governance, where intensive Internet governance training was organized every year in a different country of the Americas. The South School on Internet Governance has granted more than 5000 fellowships to students and professionals from all over the world. In 2007 she co-founded ARGENSIG, the Argentina School on Intenet Governance, which is focused in training the future Internet Governance leaders of Argentina.

References 

Women Internet pioneers
21st-century Argentine women
Living people
Year of birth missing (living people)